The Battle of Brovary was a military engagement during the Kyiv offensive of the 2022 Russian invasion of Ukraine for control of the suburb of Brovary, to the east of the capital city of Ukraine, Kyiv. Russian forces advanced west from southern Chernihiv Oblast and were engaged by Ukrainian forces. Control of the suburb was contested until Russian forces withdrew on 2 April 2022.

Battle

March
On the evening of 9 March 2022, a column of Russian armored vehicles advanced into Brovary from the north via Highway M01. The column, consisting of the 6th and 239th Tank Regiments of the 90th Guards Tank Division, moved very slowly and included many highly outdated vehicles such as T-72 tanks, described as ill-suited to modern warfare by analysts. In addition, the convoy was headed by self-propelled artillery such as TOS-1, which were especially vulnerable targets.

On 10 March, at Skybyn village near Brovary, Ukrainian forces saw an opportunity to ambush the Russian troops and attacked. Using artillery and antitank missiles, the Ukrainians disabled several tanks and armored personnel carriers. A Ukrainian soldier later stated that the ambushers initially targeted the first and last vehicles in the convoy to trap the rest in the middle. The attack was not entirely successful, as the Ukrainians were unable to cut off the Russians' route of retreat. However, the Russian column suffered heavy losses and was forced to retreat. Ukrainian officials claimed that the commander of the 6th Tank Regiment, Colonel Andrei Zakharov, was killed in the skirmish. Some Russian soldiers reportedly fled on foot into the nearby woods and villages.

Despite the retreat of the 90th Guards Tank Division, heavy fighting erupted in villages east of the ambush site, where fighting lasted for several days between Russian and Ukrainian troops. Russian survivors of the ambush shot civilians in the villages, suspecting them of aiding the local defenders.

On 12 March, Russia claimed it had disabled the Ukraine military's main centre for radio intelligence in Brovary with a high-precision strike. The mayor of Brovary, Ihor Sapozhko said fighting were taking place nearly 25 kilometers from the city and claimed the Russians had suffered heavy casualties, and was quoted "We are ready for them."

On 29 March, Russia started to shell the Brovary area. A warehouse was set ablaze and nearby villages sustained heavy damage.

On 30 March, Sapozhko stated that Ukrainian forces had pushed back Russian troops and recaptured the villages of Ploske, Svetilny, and Hrebelky, with ongoing clashes in Nova Basan.

April
On 1 April, Ukraine claimed the recapture of the villages of Rudnya, Shevchenkove, Bobryk, Stara Basan, Nova Basan, Makiyivka, Pohreby, Bazhanivka, Volodymyrivka, Shnyakivka, Salne, Sofiyivka, and Havrylivka. Sapozhko claimed that Russian forces had "almost left" the entire Brovary district, with Ukrainian forces engaging in "mopping up" operations.

On 2 April 2022 the whole of Kyiv Oblast, where Brovary is located in, was declared free of Russian troops by the Ukrainian Ministry of Defense.

References 

Brovary
History of Kyiv Oblast
Kyiv offensive (2022)
Brovary
March 2022 events in Ukraine